O'Toole is a surname of Irish origin. It an anglicized form of the Gaelic Ó Tuathail meaning "descendant of Tuathal", composed of tuath "the people" and gal "mighty". The O'Toole family were a leading clan in Gaelic Leinster and Ulster.

Notable people 
 Adam Dubh Ó Tuathail, heretic, executed 1327
 Annette O'Toole (b. 1952), American dancer and actress 
 Anton O'Toole, Irish footballer
 Chauncey O'Toole (b. 1986), Canadian rugby player
 Donald L. O'Toole (1902–1964), American politician
 Edmund O'Toole,  soldier won the Victoria Cross in the Anglo-Zulu war 
 Erin O'Toole (b. 1973), Canadian politician
 Fintan O'Toole (b. 1958), columnist and drama critic for The Irish Times
 Gary O'Toole, Irish Olympic Swimmer
 James O'Toole (American politician) (b. 1958)
 James O'Toole (mobster) (1929–1973), Irish-American gangster in Boston area
 Jason O'Toole (journalist) (b. 1973), Irish author and senior editor of Hot Press magazine
 Jason O'Toole (musician) (b. 1969), vocalist for New York hardcore band Life's Blood
 Jed O'Toole, American musician
 Jennifer Cook O'Toole, American author
 Jim O'Toole. American baseball player
 Joe O'Toole, Irish politician
 John O'Toole, politician in Ontario, Canada
 John-Joe O'Toole (b. 1988), Irish footballer
 Kate O'Toole (radio presenter), radio presenter from Sydney, Australia
 Kathleen O'Toole (b. 1954), former police commissioner of Boston, Massachusetts
 Kevin J. O'Toole (b. 1964), American Republican Party politician
 Kevin O'Toole (bodybuilder), Canadian bodybuilder and mixed martial artist
 Lorcán Ua Tuathail (1128-1180), Archbishop of Dublin and Saint
 Mark O'Toole (musician) (b. 1964), British bassist
 Matt O'Toole, TV actor
 Maureen O'Toole (b. 1961), American water polo player and coach
 Mick O'Toole (1931–2018), Irish racehorse trainer
 Mor Ui Thuathail (c. 1114–1191), Queen of Leinster
 Muirchertach Ua Tuathail (fl. 1114) King of Ui Muirdeaigh, father-in-law of Diarmait Mac Murchada
 Paddy O'Toole, Irish politician
 Pat O'Toole, Canadian lacrosse player
 Peter O'Toole (1932–2013), Irish actor
 Randal O'Toole, American economist and public policy expert 
 Rich O'Toole , American Singer - Songwriter 
 Tom O'Toole (disambiguation)

Fictional characters
 Plenty O'Toole, in the 1971 James Bond film Diamonds Are Forever
 JD O'Toole, in Grand Theft Auto: Liberty City Stories

See also
Tohill
Toal (disambiguation)
O'Toole (disambiguation)